Thrall is a ghost town in Wright County, in the U.S. state of Iowa.

History
A post office called Thrall was established in 1882, and remained in operation until it was discontinued in 1907. Thrall was platted in 1886. It was named for W. A. Thrall, a railroad official.

References

Geography of Wright County, Iowa
Ghost towns in Iowa
1882 establishments in Iowa